The Roberts Mountains Formation is a geologic formation in Nevada and Idaho.

It preserves fossils dating back to the Silurian period.

See also

 List of fossiliferous stratigraphic units in Nevada
 Paleontology in Nevada

References
 

Silurian geology of Nevada
Silurian System of North America
Geologic formations of Nevada
Silurian southern paleotropical deposits
Devonian southern paleotropical deposits